Stepnoy is a rural locality (a khutor) in Khopyorskoye Rural Settlement, Novonikolayevsky District, Volgograd Oblast, Russia. The population was 84 as of 2010. There are 2 streets.

Geography 
Stepnoy is located in steppe, on the Khopyorsko-Buzulukskaya Plain, 50 km east of Novonikolayevsky (the district's administrative centre) by road. Khopyorsky is the nearest rural locality.

References 

Rural localities in Novonikolayevsky District